This is a list of monarchs of Bora Bora.

Monarchs of Bora Bora

Family tree of monarchs

See also
 Kingdom of Bora Bora
 List of monarchs of Huahine
 List of monarchs of Raiatea
 List of monarchs of Tahiti
 List of colonial and departmental heads of French Polynesia
 President of French Polynesia

References

Bora Bora
Bora Bora
Monarchs
Bora Bora Monarchs